In theatre, in the round is where a performance space is surrounded by the audience.

In the round may also refer to:
 Freestanding sculpture, distinct from relief carving — see Statue
 In the Round, 1986 album by Pentangle
 In the Round (TV series), Canadian music variety television series